Parker Mack Klebenow, known professionally as Parker Mack, is an American actor, writer, musician, and director, who is best known for his role as Finn Madill in the Freeform drama Chasing Life, and as Felix Turner in the MTV romantic comedy series, Faking It.

Life and career 
Mack was born in St. Louis, Missouri, the son of Kristen and Lindsay Klebenow. As a child, Mack worked as a model for companies such as Kohls and Shopko. He began acting when he was six years old, when he booked his first job as a boy in a Bounce Around commercial.

In 2013, Mack attended the John Rosenfeld Acting Studio in Los Angeles, studying under David Sullivan. He graduated Hinsdale Central High School in the class of 2015.

Mack is of mostly German descent (including ethnic Germans from Russia), along with Finnish and Scottish. He has two older sisters, Kathryn and Kelley Mack, who is also an actor. Parker has lived in five different states throughout his life.

Mack has a passion for music and plays piano by ear. He also plays the drums and sings with a baritone voice. He loves writing his own music, and has a knack for learning new songs very quickly. His favorite genres are rock and jazz. He has had over nine years of lessons in piano and the drums. He was also a part of a band, called "Bruner 17", where he played the drums.

He has played tennis competitively in USTA tournaments since he was 12 years old. He also boxes and lifts weights.

Filmography

References

External links 

1996 births
Living people
American male film actors
American male television actors
Male actors from St. Louis